Psiloparmelia salazinica is a species of foliose lichen in the family Parmeliaceae. It is found in South America.

Taxonomy
The lichen was described as a new species in 1992 by lichenologists John Elix and Tom Nash. The species has also been recorded from Chile. The specific epithet refers to the presence of salazinic acid, a secondary compound that helps to distinguish it from a similar species, Psiloparmelia distincta.

Description
The lobes are dull, becoming pruinose near the tips. The apothecia measure  in diameter; the ascospores are roughly spherical to elliptical in shape, measuring 4.5–5.5 by 7–9 μm. Pycnidia are common in this lichen; they are immersed in the surface of the thallus, and produce bifusiform conidia (i.e., rod-shaped with minute swellings at each end) measuring 0.5 by 5–6 μm.

Secondary chemicals that occur in this species are usnic acid (major), minor amounts of atranorin and salazinic acid, and minor to trace amounts of consalazinic acid, norstictic acid, and protocetraric acid. The expected results of standard chemical spot tests are: cortex K+ (yellow-pale red), C−, PD+ (yellow-orange), while in the medulla they are K−, C−, KC−, and PD−.

References

Parmeliaceae
Lichen species
Lichens described in 1992
Lichens of Argentina
Lichens of Chile
Taxa named by John Alan Elix
Taxa named by Thomas Hawkes Nash III